The 2013–14 Colorado Avalanche season was the 35th season for the National Hockey League (NHL) franchise that was established on June 22, 1979, and 19th season since the franchise relocated to Colorado to start the 1995–96 NHL season. The Avalanche managed to qualify for the playoffs for the first time since the 2009–10 season. They also claimed the top spot in the division for the first time since 2003.

Off-season
On May 23, 2013, the Avalanche named former goaltender Patrick Roy as their new head coach and vice president of hockey operations.

Regular season
On October 30, 2013, goaltender Semyon Varlamov turned himself into Denver police on charges of kidnapping and assault. The charges were later dismissed.

Four players were chosen to represent their country at the 2014 Winter Olympics: Matt Duchene (Canada), Gabriel Landeskog (Sweden), Paul Stastny (United States) and Semyon Varlamov (Russia).

Standings

Schedule and results

Pre-season

Regular season

Playoffs

Player statistics
Final stats 
Skaters

Goaltenders

Goaltenders

†Denotes player spent time with another team before joining the Avalanche. Stats reflect time with the Avalanche only.
‡Traded mid-season
Bold/italics denotes franchise record

Awards and honours

Awards

Milestones

Records

Transactions
The following transactions took place during the 2013–14 NHL season.

Trades

Free agents acquired

Free agents lost

Claimed via waivers

Lost via waivers

Lost via retirement

Player signings

Draft picks
Colorado Avalanche's picks at the 2013 NHL Entry Draft, to be held in Newark, New Jersey, on June 30, 2013.

References

Colorado Avalanche seasons
Colorado Avalanche season, 2013-14
Colorado
Colorado Avalanche
Colorado Avalanche